ORP Piorun was an N-class destroyer operated by the Polish Navy in World War II. The word piorun is Polish for "Thunderbolt". Ordered by the Royal Navy in 1939, the ship was laid down as HMS Nerissa before being loaned to the Poles in October 1940 while still under construction.

After World War II, Piorun was returned to the Royal Navy and recommissioned as HMS Noble before being scrapped in 1955.

Design
The eight ships of the N-class were ordered on 15 April 1939. They were a repeat of the J- and K-class destroyers, 16 of which were ordered in 1937.

Displacement was  standard and  full load.

As designed, the N-class were to be armed with six  QF Mark XII guns in three twin mountings, two forward and one aft. These guns could only elevate to an angle of 40 degrees, and so were of limited use in the anti-aircraft role. A short range anti-aircraft armament of a four-barrelled 2-pounder "pom-pom" anti-aircraft mount and eight .50 in machine guns in two quadruple mounts on the bridge wings was to be fitted, while torpedo armament was to be ten  torpedo tubes in two quintuple mounts. Early experience of the vulnerability of destroyers to air attack off Norway and during the evacuation from Dunkirk in 1940 resulted in the armament of the N-class being revised during construction. The aft set of torpedo-tubes was removed and replaced by a single  QF Mark V anti-aircraft gun, while the quadruple .50 in machine guns on the bridge wings were replaced by two single Oerlikon 20 mm cannon, with two more Oerlikons abaft the searchlight, while two twin .50 inch  machine guns were mounted on the ships' quarterdeck.

History
The ship was built by John Brown & Company of Clydebank, Glasgow. She was laid down on 26 July 1939, launched on 7 May 1940. While initially ordered and launched under the name Nerissa, the ship was transferred to the Polish Navy in October 1940 and renamed Piorun. She was completed on 4 November 1940.

Piorun was based in Great Britain and commanded by Commander Eugeniusz Pławski. Between 13 and 15 March 1941, while undergoing repairs in John Brown's shipyard, she took part in the defence of Clydebank against air raids by the Luftwaffe. A memorial to the ship's crew was later erected in Clydebank.

Bismarck action

On 22 May 1941, Piorun, with ships of the British 4th Destroyer Flotilla (and ), commanded by Captain Philip Vian, provided additional escort to troop convoy WS8B en route from Glasgow to the Indian Ocean.

Piorun took part, along with the British destroyers, in the search for Bismarck (she was the first of the destroyers to spot the German ship). She joined in the shadowing of and torpedo attacks on the German battleship the night before Bismarck was sunk. Arriving first on the scene with the British Tribal-class destroyer Maori, Piorun charged at Bismarck by herself, while Maori manoeuvred for position to fire torpedoes. Alone, Piorun exchanged fire with Bismarck for an hour, with neither side scoring any hits—although after the third salvo, Bismarck missed by only , causing Pławski to pull away.

According to one report (detailed at the Auschwitz I exhibition, Oświęcim, Poland), Pławski transmitted the message "I am a Pole" before commencing fire on Bismarck; other sources say the signal to commence fire was "Trzy salwy na cześć Polski" ("Three salvoes in honour of Poland"). This manoeuvre and the subsequent withdrawal caused Piorun to lose contact with Bismarck.

Another often repeated story, possibly an embellishment, mentions that the Piorun constantly signaled "I am a Pole" using her signal lights for the entirety of the engagement.

Piorun was very low on fuel, so at 05:00 she was ordered home before she had used her torpedoes. Pławski was reluctant to leave the area and ignored Vian's order for an hour before returning to the United Kingdom.

Subsequent activity
Piorun subsequently operated in the Mediterranean, taking part in Operation Halberd, one of the Malta convoys and Operation Husky, the invasion of Sicily. In 1944 she was transferred to the Home Fleet. On 8 June 1944, the Piorun took part in the Battle of Ushant against Kriegsmarine destroyers.

She was returned to the Royal Navy in 1946, as HMS Noble and scrapped in 1955.

Notes

References
 
 
 
 
 
 
 
 
 
 
 
 

 

J, K and N-class destroyers of the Royal Navy
Ships built on the River Clyde
1940 ships
World War II destroyers of the United Kingdom
N-class destroyers of the Polish Navy
World War II destroyers of Poland
Operation Overlord
Cold War destroyers of the United Kingdom